Microsyagrus is a genus of leaf beetles in the subfamily Eumolpinae. It is known from Africa. Many of the species were formerly placed in Syagrus.

Species
 Microsyagrus bingeri (Pic, 1949)
 Microsyagrus bingervillensis Selman, 1973
 Microsyagrus discoidalis (Pic, 1940)
 Microsyagrus favareli (Pic, 1938)
 Microsyagrus fulvimanus (Jacoby, 1904)
 Microsyagrus gabonicus (Pic, 1949)
 Microsyagrus gossypii (Bryant, 1933)
 Microsyagrus immaculatus (Pic, 1949)
 Microsyagrus insignitus (Jacoby, 1898)
 Microsyagrus madoni (Pic, 1940)
 Microsyagrus marshalli Selman, 1965
 Microsyagrus mashonanus (Jacoby, 1897)
 Microsyagrus notatus Pic, 1952
 Microsyagrus punctaticollis Zoia, 2019
 Microsyagrus raffrayi (Pic, 1940)
 Microsyagrus recticollis (Pic, 1949)
 Microsyagrus rosae (Bryant, 1936)
 Microsyagrus saegeri Selman, 1972
 Microsyagrus testaceonotatus (Pic, 1940)
 Microsyagrus trinotatus (Pic, 1939)
 Microsyagrus unicolor Pic, 1952
 Microsyagrus variabilis Selman, 1972
 Microsyagrus zeae (Bryant, 1948)

Species moved to Afroeurydemus:
 Microsyagrus annulipes Pic, 1952
 Microsyagrus cribricollis Pic, 1952: renamed to Afroeurydemus fortesculptus Zoia, 2019

Other synonyms:
 Microsyagrus trinotatus Pic, 1952: renamed to Microsyagrus punctaticollis Zoia, 2019

References

Eumolpinae
Chrysomelidae genera
Taxa named by Maurice Pic
Beetles of Africa